Death in children's literature has changed over the course of history as both the average lifespan has increased and society's morals and beliefs and conceptions of children have changed.

Early history
Until about the 17th century, there was very little literature written specifically for children.  Oral storytelling and music accepted death as a matter-of-fact for both children and adults alike. Since mortality rates for children were much higher then, the subject was not taboo. The restoration of life, life as a preparation for death, death as a form of sleep, immortality, animals sacrificing themselves for humans, love as a conqueror of death, and inanimate objects that come to life were all common themes.

Examples of the changing approach to death include: The Juniper Tree by the Brothers Grimm, in which a boy is murdered by his stepmother, but comes back as a bird and kills the stepmother. The bird then turns back into a boy and is reunited with his father and sister. The stepmother, though, does not come back to life.

Morality lesson
Andrew Lang's Fairy Books series contains numerous stories with references to death. In one instance, the reader is encouraged to live a good or "perfect" life in order to go to Heaven after death. In others, both animals and humans gain immortality. Already the concept that bad people stay dead and good, loving people return to life is evident. A better-known example is Sleeping Beauty, in which a character's death is just a sleep that is conquered by love. These themes are also seen in the Slavic story Firebird and the retold versions of Le Morte d'Arthur by William Caxton and Robin Hood by Howard Pyle.

Faith is also a factor in life and death. A well-known example is John Bunyan's Pilgrim's Progress, originally written for children. Life is a journey of faith that will end at the gates of heaven. Those having lived a good (in this case Christian) life, enter. In Hans Christian Andersen's original Little Mermaid, the character must endure a journey, suffering and ultimately death for others, after which she is rewarded with an immortal soul. Aesop's Fables also contain such references both in the versions written exclusively for adults and those for both children and adults.

Early humor
Often death has even been the subject of jokes, such as in the various versions of The Girl with the Green Ribbon in which a young girl wears a green ribbon around her neck and a young boy asks her about it, but she puts him off. The two grow up together and eventually marry with the boy/man often asking her about the ribbon, but she continues to disregard the subject as "not important" or "not the right time". Finally when they are very old, she consents to have him untie the ribbon, and her head falls off.

In Alice's Adventures in Wonderland, she jokes that if she falls and dies, she will be "quite a story back home". There is also the Mother Goose rhyme in which Humpty Dumpty falls and dies, because he is an egg that breaks and can not be re-built.

Scientific approach
Later this somewhat philosophical or spiritual approach would be replaced by a more scientific approach wherein the illusion of death as a form of sleep is denied and the decomposition of bodies is discussed.  This viewpoint may have been popularized by Puritan beliefs that death is a punishment for sin. In favor of this argument would be such texts as James Janeway's nonfiction A Token for Children: An Exact Account of the Conversion, Holy and Exemplary Lives and Joyful Deaths of Several Young Children. While life is still shown as fragile, emphasis is placed on the importance of salvation rather than on fantastical alternatives of rebirth as animals, immortality and such. Louisa May Alcott's well-known Little Women alludes to the story of John Bunyan's Pilgrim's Progress at the same time that she shows the characters, including one who dies, on a journey through the house. Even in this story one can see that opinions are changing as death becomes less of an expectation in society.

20th century to present

Death as plot device
Death becomes more of a plot device at this time, such as in Frances Hodgson Burnett's A Little Princess and The Secret Garden.  Sarah Crewe's parents die while she is in England and, as a result, becomes maid. Mary Lennox's parents are killed and she is sent to live with her uncle, who is still grieving for his wife and unwilling to even meet his son for fear that he will die as well. In Bambi, the focal point of the story is the title character's survival through his mother's sacrifice.

In these examples, death is treated much more subtly, alluded to as something that happened previously, not something to discuss frankly with children. In 1958, Margaret Wise Brown published The Dead Bird, a simple picture book in which children find a dead bird. Just a few years later, children would hear about the deaths in the Vietnam War and the various political assassinations.  These historical events may have had an effect on why some parents and educators now agree that death is a "fact of life" that is acceptable for children to be introduced to. At the same time, the cold, impersonal treatment of death begins to disappear in favor of the previous themes of leading a good life, love overcoming death, immortality, inanimate objects having or obtaining life, sacrificing one's life for others, and other such moral or "uplifting" themes. Still, even in the death-related books published in the 1970s and 1980s, feelings about death are discussed with children only 35% of the time and comfort was slightly more likely to be physical (54%) than verbal (48%).

Continuance
In The Giving Tree by Shel Silverstein, a tree sacrifices itself for a boy it loves. Then later, the boy returns as an old man to the tree stump and the two comfort each other. In Charlotte's Web by E.B. White, the pig Wilbur is afraid of death and the spider, Charlotte, spends her life creating messages in her web in order to save him. When she dies, "she lives on through her 500 offspring" and through the love of Wilbur. In C.S. Lewis's The Lion, the Witch, and the Wardrobe, an allegory to the Christian belief in Jesus, the lion Aslan sacrifices himself for the Pevensie children and later resurrects in time to vanquish the White Witch. In Natalie Babbitt's Tuck Everlasting, the Tucks have the fountain of eternal youth, but Winnie Foster chooses not to partake in this "life without death". Katherine Paterson's character Jess in Bridge to Terabithia is confused over the accidental death of his friend, Leslie.  In A Taste of Blackberries by Doris Buchanan Smith, a child dies from an allergic reaction. In Admission to the Feast by Gunnel Beckman, and in Kira-Kira by Cynthia Kadohata, a young character dies of cancer. In The Tenth Good Thing about Barney by Judith Viorst, the last good thing about the deceased cat, Barney, is that his decaying body helps the flowers to grow – a sort of "natural immortality".<ref name="corr1">Corr, Charles A. (2003) Pet Loss in Death-Related Literature for Children. Omega-Journal of Death and Dying v.48(4): 399-414.</ref>

Introduction of death concept
The death of animals with or without human personalities is a popular way to introduce the topic to younger children. The death of an animal or inanimate object such as a plant made up 2% of the deaths in literature for children ages three to eight written in the 1970s and 1980s.  In Hemery's Not Just a Fish, a young girl's fish dies and the girl deals with both her grief and the sympathy or disregard of others. This book actually shows a new trend that exists in society: adults disregard for, or ignorance of, the grief of children. In Tough Boris by Fox, a character shown previously as a gruff, fearless pirate is grief-stricken when his parrot dies. In Viorst's The Tenth Good Thing About Barney, a child is challenged to think of good things about a lost pet named Barney, while he and his family prepare for memorial activities. The use of animals allows the authors to broach the subject of replacing a loved one, such as in Charlotte's Web when Charlotte's memory lives on through her children. More examples are available in The Yearling by Marjorie Kinnan Rawlings, The Black Stallion by Walter Farley, Old Yeller by Fred Gipson and Where the Red Fern Grows by Wilson Rawls. One hypothesis for shielding children from death is that with the advent of modern medicine and changing attitudes about family, death is more removed from our lives than ever before. For example, in Zolotow's My Grandson Lew, a mother must admit to her six-year-old son that his grandfather and namesake has died and she did not tell him.

Despite all the above examples having more the feel of the earlier themes of death, there are still scientific or formulaic approaches to death available for children, such as in the workbooks, They're Part of the Family: Barklay and Eve Talk to Children About Pet Loss and Saying Goodbye to Your Pet: Children Can Learn to Cope with Grief.

Religious perspectives still play a role in the treatment of death. An estimated 40% of literature for children ages 3 to 8 written in the 1970s and 1980s gave indications of religious beliefs. While only 16% included affirmation of those beliefs, none include disapproval. In one instance, a text even came under fire for being too vague in its description of the religious aspect of death: some readers took offense to Maria Shriver's What's Heaven?, because it did not specifically mention Jesus and because it did not dwell on whether or not everyone went to heaven. Boritzer's What is Death?, published only a year later, seems to be a response of sorts to this issue since it shows a variety of opinions on death. The lack of specifics does not appear to affect the popularity of Lifetimes: A Beautiful Way to Explain Death to Children by Mellonie and Ingpen. The universality of death is a subject in The Big Wave by Pearl Buck and The Fall of Freddie the Leaf by Buscaglia.

A study of 110 books written in the 1970s and 1980s for children ages 3 to 8 concluded that 85% were fiction, but in 80% of the books, the information about death was considered correct and death was presented as final. In only 28% of the books was the death considered an inevitability. In the 72% that included physical details of death, burial was most frequently mentioned. After that, the category of items most likely to be mentioned (in order) were the dead body, a complete lack of physical details, the casket, and the funeral home. Other identifiers such as the headstone, organ donation, morgue, coroner, death records and/or laws, the grave or cemetery, embalming and autopsy, and related themes were rarely, if ever, mentioned.

While "life after death" is only the subject of 31% of the books written for 3 to 8 year-olds that included death between 1970 and 1989, the focus of ongoing memory as a method of immortality is seen in many texts, such as The Tenth Good Thing About Barney, mentioned above.  In Dusty Was My Friend by Clardy, a boy dies in an auto accident and the family shares their experiences and memories in order to continue with life.  In Mick Harte Was Here by Barbara Park, a girl loses her brother to a bicycle accident because he did not have a helmet, and so she makes it her mission to remind people to wear helmets.  In Badger's Parting Gifts, by Susan Varley, an old badger knows he will die and is concerned with giving his friends special memories to remember him.

Realistic approach
Since the 1960s, literature for children is increasingly more realistic and "problem oriented", so death is just one of many topics approached. For example, John Gunther's Death Be Not Proud is more realistic than many of the death-related texts written prior. However, some studies have shown that there are gender factors affecting how the characters react to death and the experiences they have. According to the article Who Dies and Who Cries, by Moore and Mae, males are more likely to show no visible signs of grief while females are more likely to express grief, particularly by crying. However males are slightly more likely to show anger and both are equally likely to socially withdraw at first. Also, the reactions to long-term grief are less likely to be shown in all cases. This can be seen in the more graphic details of deaths often depicted in texts aimed at males such as in My Brother Sam is Dead'' by James Lincoln Collier and Christopher Collier.

Not only are the responses to death not even, neither are the subjects of death. In the literature for children ages 3 to 8 written in the 1970s and 1980s, where someone died, 51% of the deaths were adults, 28% were animals or plants and only 9% were children (six books). Of the adults who died, 91% were "grandparent age" and 9% were "parent age". However, when children died they were more likely to be elementary school age (67%) than high school age (33%). Of the deaths described, 74% were relatives, versus 21% who were non-relatives. The gender of the person dying was about even. Often, the place or cause of death is not mentioned (42% and 49% respectively). Though it is estimated that at least half of actual deaths occur at a hospital or nursing home, hospitals were the location for only 12% of deaths in the studied books. Diseases such as heart disease or pneumonia, accidents and old age were the most likely causes, while seasonal changes, suicide and war accounted for three deaths.

References

Children's literature
Children and death
Death in art
Fiction about death